Bogdan Mihăiţă Vrăjitoarea (born 7 February 1978, Craiova, Romania) is a Romanian former footballer.

External links

1978 births
Living people
Romanian footballers
FC U Craiova 1948 players
AFC Rocar București players
FC Dinamo București players
FC Astra Giurgiu players
ACF Gloria Bistrița players
FC Bihor Oradea players
FC Argeș Pitești players
FC Politehnica Iași (1945) players
FC Unirea Urziceni players
CSM Jiul Petroșani players
CSM Ceahlăul Piatra Neamț players
CS Mioveni players
CF Liberty Oradea players
Liga I players
Association football forwards
Sportspeople from Craiova